Padmavathy Iyengar, better known by her stage name, Menaka, is an Indian actress and film producer. She made her debut in the 1979 Tamil film Ramayi Vayasukku Vanthutta. In an acting career spanning from 1980 to 1987, Menaka appeared in over 125 films as a heroine, mostly in Malayalam. She also appeared in few Tamil, Telugu, Kannada and Hindi films. She married film producer G. Suresh Kumar. After 19 years, she made a comeback through the television serial Kaliveedu. At 8th SIIMA, she received SIIMA Lifetime Achievement Award.

Early life
Menaka, whose real name is Padmavathy, was born into a Tamil Iyengar Brahmin family in Nagercoil, Kanyakumari district, India. She was the only daughter among the four children of Rajagopal and Saroja. Both her parents were school teachers. Her mother Saroja taught at the Lourdes Girls' Higher Secondary School in Perambur, Madras.

Career
Menaka had become one of the highest-paid actresses in South Indian cinema when she decided to retire from acting post-marriage. After 24 years, she made a comeback as a film actress in 2011 with Fazil-directed Living Together, in a character role.

Personal life
Menaka married film producer G. Suresh Kumar at Guruvayur Temple on 27 October 1987. They have two daughters — Revathy and Keerthy Suresh. Initially they settled in Chennai and later moved to Thiruvananthapuram. Keerthy is a film actress and Revathy is an assistant director.

Filmography

As an actress

Malayalam

Tamil

Telugu

Kannada

As producer

Television
 All shows are in Malayalam unless noted otherwise

Serials

TV shows

References

External links
 Menaka at MSI
 

Living people
Indian film actresses
Actresses in Kannada cinema
Tamil actresses
Actresses in Malayalam cinema
Indian women film producers
Film producers from Tamil Nadu
20th-century Indian actresses
21st-century Indian actresses
Malayalam film producers
Actresses from Tamil Nadu
Actresses in Hindi cinema
Actresses in Telugu cinema
Businesswomen from Tamil Nadu
People from Kanyakumari district
Actresses in Malayalam television
Actresses in Tamil television
Year of birth missing (living people)
South Indian International Movie Awards winners